Kantonsschule Stadelhofen (KST) in Zürich-Stadelhofen is an upper secondary school in the Canton of Zürich in Switzerland.
KST is organized as a public high school that is teaching on the level of the maturity profiles altsprachlich (classical languages), neusprachlich (modern languages), musisch (fine arts), and mathematisch-naturwissenschaftlich (mathematical and natural sciences). The school in its present form was established in 1975, but its predecessing institution dates back to the former Töchterschule der Stadt Zürich which was established in 1874.

Villa Hohenbühl 

Villa Hohenbühl was built by the Swiss architect Alfred Bluntschli for Friedrich Wegmann-Schoch from 1887 to 1889. As Bluntschli served also as the architect for the construction of the Enge Church on the opposite Zürichsee lake shore, there ary many similarities in the construction. Surrounded by a beautiful park, the building now houses premises of the adjacent Stadelhofen college.

References

External links 

  

Upper secondary schools in the Canton of Zürich
Educational institutions established in 1874
1874 establishments in Switzerland
Educational institutions established in 1975
1975 establishments in Switzerland
Hochschulen
Schools in Zürich